The 2017 H1 Unlimited season is the sixty-second running of the H1 Unlimited series for unlimited hydroplanes, sanctioned by the APBA.

Teams and drivers 

Note: Ṫ—The U-3 is the only piston powered boat in the fleet, powered by a dual turbocharged Allison V-12.

Season Schedule and Results 

Note: The 2017 Madison Regatta was an unofficial H1 Unlimited event. The event was won by Andrew Tate in the U-9 Delta/Realtrac.

National High Points Standings

References 

H1 Unlimited
H1 Unlimited seasons
Hydro
Hydro